Naimbanna II (1720 – 11 November 1793) was Obai (King) of the Temne people of Sierra Leone.

Naimbanna had some variants of his name, such as Nemgbana, which may refer to a place called Gbana, with the suggestion that when asked what he was called the king replied "name Gbana". He allowed the British to stay in the Freetown peninsula which had been unwittingly ceded to them by his sub-chief, Tom. Nemgbana later signed the treaty in 1788 giving this land to the colony. He, himself, may have done so unwittingly, as he could not read or write, and may not have realised that the British meant to take permanent possession. In any case, his other actions showed that he was not totally opposed to the presence of the colony in his territory. In fact, in 1785, before the colony was founded, he had granted a French officer land on Gambia Island, close to what is now Hastings. 

In 1785 he sent his son Pedro to France.

In 1791 he sent his eldest son, John Frederick Naimbanna, to England where he came under the tutelage of Henry Thornton. While in London he became a Christian adopting the forenames Henry  and Granville after Henry Thornton and Granville Sharp.

Further reading
Obai
Sierra Leone
Temne

References

1720 births
1793 deaths
Temne people